is a creature from the folklore  of Amakusa in Kumamoto prefecture.

Mythology
This spirit, which surprises people on the Kusazumigoe mountain pass, is thought to be the ghost of a human who stole oil.

In the days before electricity, oil was a very valuable commodity, necessary for lighting and heating a house. As such, the theft of oil, particularly from temples and shrines, could lead to punishment via reincarnation as a yōkai.

In modern media the abura-sumashi is often depicted as, "a squat creature with a straw-coat covered body and a potato-like or stony head," an appearance inspired by the artwork of Shigeru Mizuki.

References

Yōkai